Nawa may refer to:

 Nawa, Rajasthan, a city and Tehsil in Nagaur district in the Indian State of Rajasthan
 Nawa District, a district in Ghazni Province, Afghanistan
 Nawa, Afghanistan, a town in the central part of Nawa District, in Ghazni Province, Afghanistan
 Nawa Region, a region in Bas-Sassandra District of Ivory Coast
 Nawa, Tottori, a town in Saihaku District, Tottori, Japan
 Nawa, Syria, a city in Daraa Governorate, Syria
 Nawa, Salamiyah, a village in the Hama Governorate, Syria
 Na'wah (Upper Yafa),  a sheikhdom and dependency of Upper Yafa
 Nawa-I-Barakzayi, a village in Nawa District of Helmand Province, Afghanistan
 Nawa-I-Barakzayi District, a district in Helmand Province, Afghanistan
 NAWA, abbreviation of Northern Africa and Western Asia
 National Association of Women Artists, a US artist organisation

See also
 Amphoe Na Wa, a district in Nakhon Phanom Province, Thailand
 Maqam Nawah, a mode in the Arabic Maqam system
 Nahua (disambiguation)